Craig Robert ("Wattie") Watson (born 2 June 1971 in Invercargill) is an athlete from the New Zealand, who competed in triathlon.

Watson competed at the first Olympic triathlon at the 2000 Summer Olympics. He took sixteenth place with a total time of 1:50:01.16. In 2001 he placed 3rd at the World Championships at Edmonton, Canada. He also won the ITU World Cup race in Rennes, France and for a time was ranked number one in the world.

Watson retired from the sport after narrowly failing to win an automatic spot on the New Zealand Olympic team for Athens 2004, after finishing 6th at the 2003 World Championships in Queenstown, New Zealand.

Watson lived and raced in Europe, based in France for many years and now lives in Pau with his French wife Héléne Salomon herself a successful triathlete. Together they have two daughters Juliet and Leilani and run a triathlon race wear business called Kiwami.

References

1971 births
Living people
Olympic triathletes of New Zealand
Triathletes at the 2000 Summer Olympics
Sportspeople from Invercargill
Triathletes at the 2002 Commonwealth Games
Commonwealth Games competitors for New Zealand
New Zealand male triathletes
20th-century New Zealand people
21st-century New Zealand people